The gamut2 is an indoor rowing machine (or "erg") designed to duplicate the motion and feel of sweep rowing in a racing scull.  It enables the coach to evaluate the stroke of individual rowers, including the power applied during the different phases of the stroke.

History

The original gamut was introduced in 1971.  The gamut2 was introduced 39 years later in 2010.

External links
gamut2 - official site
Friends of Rowing History - time-line mentions launch and impact of the original gamut

Rowing equipment manufacturers